Biel/Bienne railway station serves the bilingual municipality of Biel/Bienne, in the canton of Bern, Switzerland.

It is a major railway junction on the Swiss railways network. It lies on one of the two busiest major railway lines between the northeastern (St. Gallen/Zurich) and southwestern Switzerland (Geneva); the other goes via Bern. An InterCity between St. Gallen and Genève-Aéroport only takes 4:17h with one of its tilting train compositions (in 2019). The other major line is between Basel and Lausanne/Geneva; via Delémont it also connects the canton of Jura with the Swiss railway network. And third, it also connects the French-speaking part of canton of Bern (the Bernese Jura) and La Chaux-de-Fonds (NE) in the west with Bern in the east.

All trains of these lines meet in Biel/Bienne at a quarter after and a quarter before o'clock in a half an hour frequency according to the Swiss-wide applied clock-face scheduling, so that seamless changes of just a few (2–5) minutes between trains of all these lines are easily possible.

It is located in the center of Biel/Bienne and is therefore part of the fare zone 300 of the libero (fare network).

Biel/Bienne's railway station is the thirteenth busiest station in Switzerland with 52,100 passengers per working day (in 2016).

Services

Long-distance 
The following long-distance trains call at Biel/Bienne:

 InterCity:
 half-hourly service over the Jura Foot line to Geneva Airport or Lausanne and Zürich Hauptbahnhof or Rorschach.
 hourly service over the Basel–Biel/Bienne line to Basel SBB.
 InterRegio: half-hourly service over the Biel/Bienne–Bern line to Bern.

Regional 
The following regional trains call at Biel/Bienne:

 RegioExpress:
 hourly service over the Basel–Biel/Bienne line from Biel/Bienne to Meroux (in France).
 hourly service over the Biel/Bienne–La Chaux-de-Fonds line to La Chaux-de-Fonds.
 Regio:
 hourly to half-hourly service over the Jura Foot line to Neuchâtel.
 half-hourly service over the Biel–Täuffelen–Ins line to Ins.
 hourly service over the Biel/Bienne–La Chaux-de-Fonds line to La Chaux-de-Fonds and  via Sonceboz-Sombeval.

S-Bahn 
The following Bern S-Bahn trains call at Biel/Bienne:

 : half-hourly service over the Biel/Bienne–Bern line to Belp.
 : rush-hour service over the Biel/Bienne–Bern line to Belp.

See also

History of rail transport in Switzerland
Rail transport in Switzerland

Notes

References

External links
 
 

Railway stations in Switzerland opened in 1923
Railway stations in the canton of Bern
Swiss Federal Railways stations
Transport in Biel/Bienne